St. Patrick's Church is a Roman Catholic church in Ringsend, Dublin.

References

Ringsend
Churches of the Roman Catholic Archdiocese of Dublin